Mackenzie Thomason (born July 29, 1997) is a Canadian politician and former leader of the New Brunswick New Democratic Party.

Early life and family 
Thomason grew up in Tracy, New Brunswick until the age of 11 when his family moved to Alberta. He returned to New Brunswick upon acceptance to the University of New Brunswick.

Before becoming interim leader of the New Brunswick New Democratic Party, he worked for UPS and as a newspaper carrier in Fredericton. He is currently a bus driver in Fredericton.

Political career
Thomason first became involved with politics during the 2015 Alberta general election where Rachel Notley's Alberta New Democratic Party won a majority government. He later volunteered with the federal New Democratic Party during the 2015 Canadian federal election in the Fredericton area.

During the 2018 New Brunswick general election, Thomason ran in New Maryland—Sunbury. He was named interim leader of the New Brunswick New Democratic Party in March 2019. In 2019 federal election, he ran as the NDP candidate in Fredericton. Thomason led the New Brunswick NDP into the 2020 provincial election, he unsuccessfully ran in Fredericton North and the NDP did not win any seats in the legislature.

Thomason had intended to only lead the party until a new leader was found. A leadership election that had been scheduled for August 2019 was postponed until June 2020 due to a lack of candidates and then was postponed again until April 2021 due to the COVID-19 pandemic. However, when Premier Blaine Higgs called a snap election for September 14, 2020, he led the party through the election campaign, saying beforehand that he was in "a little bit of panic" at the prospects of leading the party in an election campaign, saying, "It wasn't something I ever thought of when I first signed up for the job." Thomason positioned the party further to the left than in previous campaigns, in order to distinguish the party from the Green Party and the Liberals. He told CBC News: "I think it's really about making sure that we cement our values... A lot of this back and forth between centre and centre left, it's not working. It's not working for the party. It's not working for electoral chances. It's definitely not working for New Brunswickers."

He participated in the televised leaders' debate on September 3, 2020, saying that the province may have to continue to run deficits in order to ensure people had access “to the services they pay for.”

Thomason's campaign focussed on bringing in a $15/hour minimum wage, senior care, making prescription medicine affordable, as well as reducing and eventually eliminating tuition for post-secondary education.

In the 2020 New Brunswick general election, the NDP failed to win a seat, and received only 1.7% of the vote province-wide. Thomason resigned as interim leader on November 15, 2020.

Thomason reassumed the NDP leadership on September 14, 2021 when he was acclaimed as permanent leader. He resigned eight months later, due to internal turmoil.

Electoral record

References 

New Brunswick New Democratic Party leaders
Living people
People from Sunbury County, New Brunswick
University of New Brunswick alumni
1997 births